Warnersville may refer to:

Warnersville, a historically African American neighborhood of Greensboro, North Carolina established by Yardley Warner
Former name of Trinidad, California
Warnersville, an unincorporated village  in Lycoming County, Pennsylvania
Original name of Kiousville, Ohio
According to accounts of John Ward Westcott's life, a village on Lime Island, Michigan where he was born